The Priest is a 2009 Russian drama film directed by Vladimir Khotinenko.

Plot 

The film begins in June 1941 in the backwater Russian village of Tikhoye in Soviet Latvia. Priest Alexander carries out the duties of his ministry, helped by his wife, Alevtina. Two days later, German troops occupy the village. As part of an effort to gain the local villagers' favor, the German occupiers are keen to reopen the Orthodox churches that had been closed by the Soviet authorities. Alexander is offered a position at the Pskov Orthodox Mission (:ru:Псковская православная миссия) to the Pskov oblast. An Orthodox church building in the village of Zakaty, confiscated and turned by the previous Soviet authorities into a hall for film showings and the like, is restored to its former use, with the church bell rescued from the lake. However, life under the Nazis is ambiguous and the priest must walk a tightrope (metaphorically) between faithful Christian service and loyalty to his country and people. A poignant scene is the Easter service, celebrated along with Red Army POWs surrounded by German guards. Alexander and Alevtina also secretly harbour Jewish orphans. Alevtina falls ill from contact with the POWs and puts the children first by losing herself in a snowstorm lest she infect the orphans. The film concludes with the Soviets back in power in the region and the priest subsequently imprisoned by the NKVD on collaboration charges. The epilogue shows the priest decades later, visited by the orphans he saved many years before.

Cast 
 Sergei Makovetsky as priest Aleksandr Ionin 
 Nina Usatova as matushka (priest's wife) Alevtina
 Liza Arzamasova as Eva 
 Kirill Pletnyov as Aleksandr Lugotintsev
 Yuri Tsurilo as Metropolitan Sergius

Release 
The film fell through at a rental cost of $6.8 million in production costs in all countries of hire amounted to only $1.7 million.

References

External links 

2009 films
2000s war drama films
Russian war drama films
Russian historical drama films
Films set in the Soviet Union
Films set in Latvia
Films set in 1941
Films directed by Vladimir Khotinenko
Eastern Front of World War II films
2009 drama films
Films about Orthodoxy
Russian World War II films